The following are the association football events of the year 1984 throughout the world.

Events 
16 May – Italian giants Juventus F.C. claims the European Cup Winners' Cup by defeating first-time European finalists FC Porto 2–1.
23 May – Tottenham Hotspur wins the UEFA Cup by defeating R.S.C. Anderlecht on penalties (4-3) after an aggregate score of 2–2 at White Hart Lane in London.
27 July – Copa Libertadores won by Independiente after defeating Grêmio on an aggregate score of 1–0.
19 September – Dutch club Fortuna Sittard makes its European debut with a draw (0-0) against Denmark's BK Copenhagen in the first round of the Cup Winners Cup.
9 December – Argentina's Independiente wins the Intercontinental Cup in Tokyo, Japan by defeating England's Liverpool F.C.: 1–0. The only goal is scored by José Alberto Percudani in the 6th minute.

National Club Champions

Asia
   – Al-Rayyan

Europe
   – K.S.K. Beveren
   – Vejle BK
 
 League – BFC Dynamo
 Cup – SG Dynamo Dresden
 
 League – Liverpool
 Cup – Everton
   – FC Kuusysi
   – Girondins de Bordeaux
   – Juventus
   – Feyenoord Rotterdam
   – Vålerenga
   – Benfica
   – Aberdeen
   – FC Zenit
   – Athletic Bilbao
   – IFK Göteborg
   – Trabzonspor
   – VfB Stuttgart

North America
  – Club América
  / :
 Chicago Sting (NASL)

South America

Metropolitano – Argentinos Juniors
Nacional – Ferro Carril Oeste
 – Blooming
 – Fluminense
 – América de Cali
 Paraguay – Guaraní

International tournaments 
 African Cup of Nations in Ivory Coast (4–18 March 1984)
 
 
 
1984 British Home Championship (13 December 1983 – 25 May 1984)

UEFA European Football Championship in France (12–27 June 1984)
 
 
 —
Olympic Games in Los Angeles, United States (29 July – 11 August 1984)

National Teams



Births

January 
 1 January
Paolo Guerrero, Peruvian footballer
Stefano Pastrello, Italian footballer
Rubens Sambueza, Argentinian footballer
 5 January – Diego Gómez, Argentine-French footballer
 7 January
 Diego Balbinot, Italian-Brazilian footballer
 Antonino Saviano, Italian footballer
 16 January – Craig Beattie, Scottish footballer  
 17 January – Xavier Margairaz, Swiss footballer 
 18 January – Rubí Sandoval, Mexican female footballer
 21 January
Leonardo Burián, Uruguayan youth international
Dejan Milovanović, Serbian footballer
Wes Morgan, Jamaican international
 23 January – Arjen Robben, Dutch international footballer
 24 January – Paulo Sérgio, Portuguese youth international  
 25 January – Stefan Kießling, German international footballer
 29 January
 Nuno Morais, Portuguese footballer  
 Safee Sali, Malaysian footballer

February 
 4 February – Waskito Sujarwoko, Indonesian footballer
 5 February – Carlos Tevez, Argentinian international footballer
 6 February – Darren Bent, English footballer 
 19 February – Devon Roberts, Grenadian international footballer
 21 February – David Odonkor, German footballer
 29 February
 Darren Ambrose, English footballer
 Giedrius Tomkevičius, Lithuanian footballer
 Hélio Pinto, Portuguese footballer
 Saylee Swen, Liberian footballer
 Ernest Bong, Vanuatuan footballer
 Stefano Pesoli, Italian footballer

March 
 1 March – Patrick Helmes, German international footballer
 4 March – Tamir Cohen, Israeli footballer 
 18 March – Gary Roberts, English footballer
 20 March – Fernando Torres, Spanish footballer

April 
 4 April – Sultan Khuranov, former Russian professional footballer
 13 April – Nemanja Vuković, Montenegrin footballer  
 29 April – Phạm Văn Quyến, Vietnamese footballer

May 
 11 May – Andrés Iniesta, Spanish footballer
 14 May – Michael Rensing, German youth international

June 
 1 June
 Jean Beausejour, Chilean footballer
 Jean-Claude Bozga, Romanian footballer
 8 June – Javier Mascherano, Argentinian international
 9 June – Wesley Sneijder, Dutch footballer
 11 June – Vagner Love, Brazilian footballer
 29 June – Ambesager Yosief, Eritrean footballer 
 30 June 
 Gabriel Badilla, Costa Rican footballer (died 2016)
 Norismaidham Ismail, Malaysian club footballer

July 
 4 July – Miguel Soares, Timorese footballer  
 7 July – Mohd Shaffik Abdul Rahman, Malaysian footballer 
 14 July – Mounir El Hamdaoui, Dutch-born Moroccan international footballer
 16 July – Roman Markelov, former Russian professional footballer
 18 July – Lee Barnard, English club  footballer
 21 July – Marcelo Rolón, Paraguayan footballer
 27 July – Alim Khabilov, former Russian professional footballer

August 
 1 August – Bastian Schweinsteiger, German footballer
 6 August – Marco Airosa, Angolan footballer  
 22 August – Lee Camp, English footballer 
 23 August
 Glen Johnson, English footballer 
 Ashley Williams, English-born Welsh international footballer

September 
 7 September 
 Miranda, Brazilian footballer
 Mark Veldmate, Dutch footballer

October 
 3 October – Anthony Le Tallec, French youth international
 14 October – Alex Scott, English footballer
 28 October – Jefferson Farfán, Peruvian footballer

November 
 8 November – Rowan Taylor, Montserrat international footballer
 10 November 
 Jean-Martial Kipré, Ivorian footballer  
 Jarno Mattila, Finnish club footballer 
 11 November  
 Stephen Hunt, English club footballer  
 Birkir Már Sævarsson, Icelandic international
 30 November – Nigel de Jong, Dutch footballer

December 
 11 December – Carlos Alberto, Brazilian footballer
 20 December – Nikolaos Karabelas, Greek footballer

Deaths

January

February

March

April

May
 8 May – Armando Del Debbio, Brazilian left back, 8 times winner of the Campeonato Paulista with Sport Club Corinthians Paulista . (79)
 8 May – William Ling (75), English football referee
 11 May – Toni Turek, West-German goalkeeper, winner of the 1954 FIFA World Cup. (65)
 12 May – Matías González, Uruguayan defender, winner of the 1950 FIFA World Cup. (58)

June
 23 June: Horst Nemec, Austrian international footballer (born 1939)

July
 3 July – Ernesto Mascheroni, Uruguayan defender, last surviving winner, that actually played, of the 1930 FIFA World Cup. (76)
 7 July – Elba de Padua Lima, Brazilian footballer and manager

September
 19 September – Álvaro Lopes Cançado, Brazilian defender, semi-finalist at the 1938 FIFA World Cup. (71)

December
 19 December – Puck van Heel (80), Dutch footballer

References

External links
  Rec.Sport.Soccer Statistics Foundation
  VoetbalStats

 
Association football by year